Matrouh Governorate is one of the governorates of Egypt. Located in the north-western part of the country, it borders Libya. Its capital is Mersa Matruh.

Municipal divisions
The governorate is divided into municipal divisions with a total estimated population as of July 2017 of 429,370.

Overview
The interior of the Matrouh Governorate is part of Egypt's Western Desert, including the Siwa Oasis, in antiquity known for its shrine to Amun. In the center of the Governorate is the Qattara Depression, descending to 133 metres below sea level.

Marsa Matrouh is the ancient  Paraitónion, Latin Paraetonium. It was the westernmost city of the Ptolemaic Kingdom in the Hellenistic period. The city of Apis, some 18 km to the west of Paraetonium, marked the boundary to Libycus nome, and the Halfaya Pass (at Sallum) marked the boundary to Marmarica proper.

Matrouh Governorate contains many historical sites related to World War II. The latter include el Alamein, which comprises cemeteries of fallen soldiers from Axis and Allied forces. An estimated 16 million mines, planted by the Europeans during the world wars and called "devil's gardens", still hinder development of most of the governorate, and are constantly being removed.

The province has been described as "religiously conservative".

Population
According to population estimates, in 2015 the majority of residents in the governorate lived in urban areas, with an urbanization rate of 70.6%. Out of an estimated 447,846 people residing in the governorate, 316,005 people lived in urban areas as opposed to only 131,841 in rural areas.

Industrial zone
According to the Egyptian Governing Authority for Investment and Free Zones (GAFI), in affiliation with the Ministry of Investment (MOI), the following industrial zones are located in this governorate:
The industrial zone in K 26

References

External links
 El Watan News of Matrouh Governorate 

 
Governorates of Egypt